The following is a list of WiMAX networks.

Standards

 IEEE 802.16 - called fixed WiMAX because of static connection without handover.
 IEEE 802.16e - called mobile WiMAX because it allows handovers between base stations.
 IEEE 802.16m - advanced air interface with data rates of 100 Mbit/s mobile and 1 Gbit/s fixed.

Networks

Africa

Americas

Asia & Oceania

Europe

See also 
List of LTE networks

References

IEEE 802
Metropolitan area networks
Network access
Technology-related lists
Telecommunications lists
WiMAX